Big Brother Polska 7 is the seventh season of the Polish reality television series Big Brother produced by EndemolShine Polska. The show returned only 3 months after season 6 ended. It premiered on September 13, 2019, on TVN 7 and finished on December 15, 2019.

Gabi Drzewiecka hosted the main show Big Brother Arena with Filip Chajzer. Sideshows include Big Brother Nocą Monday to Thursday after 23:00, Big Brother + a special live broadcast from the Big Brother House on Fridays after Big Brother Arena, and Big Brother Tydzień a summary of the past week on Sundays at 17:00 on TVN. There were also three short live broadcasts during the day. The show is also available on the internet streaming and video-on-demand service Player.

Housemates 
On 12 June 2019, three days before the finale of Big Brother 6, a housemate for Big Brother 7, Karolina Włodarska, entered the house as a guest. However, she did not appear at the premiere show, as one of the eighteen housemates to enter the house. On September 13 Karolina confirmed on social media that she would not be participating in Season 7 due to personal reasons.

On 4 September 2019, it was revealed that on Saturday 7 September 2019, the public will begin voting between 3 candidates - Martyna Lewandowska, Wiktoria Józefiok, and Seweryn Sroka. Martyna Lewandowska was chosen by the public to become the official housemate.

Nominations table

Notes

Ratings 
Official ratings are taken from Nielsen Audience Measurement.

References

External links 
 Official site

07